de Villacis is a surname. Notable people with the surname include:

Nicolás de Villacis (1616–1694), Spanish Baroque painter
Roberto de Villacis (born 1967), Ecuadorian-American fashion designer and artist

See also
Villacis